Story is a New Zealand current affairs television program that aired on TV3 and was hosted by Duncan Garner and Heather du Plessis-Allan. It premiered on 10 August 2015, and aired 7–7:30 pm, Monday–Thursday. The final show aired on 16 December 2016. It was replaced by The Project in 2017.

References

2010s New Zealand television series
2015 New Zealand television series debuts
2016 New Zealand television series endings
New Zealand television news shows
Three (TV channel) original programming